Evelyn Wanjiru Agundabweni (born 6 May 1990) is a Kenyan gospel singer, worship leader, music director, songwriter, hostess of the annual event "Praise Atmosphere" and co-founder of Bwenieve  production. She is best known for her hit songs "Mungu Mkuu", "Celebrate", "Jehovah Elohim", "Waweza," "Hossana," "Nikufahamu" and "Tulia."

Life and career 
Evelyn Wanjiru started her music career at the age of nine years, as a child, she sang in a local church and school music festivals. She is the fourth-born of Helen Muhonja and Crispin Kinyua in a family of five. Born in Nairobi in 1989 She was brought up in the Nakuru Kenya Freehold Estate, where she attended Saint Mary's Girls Primary and Langalanga Secondary.

In her early education, she was deeply involved in drama and the school choir, presaging her later success. She later joined Tears Group, Nakuru, for a course in music before further benefiting from the government of Kenya at the 2010 Talent Academy at Kabarak University Nakuru. After early successes in church and school festivals, commercial success came her way when music producer Agundabweni Akweyu  noted her talent. Together they started Bwenieve Productions, a music recording studio. She recorded her first album "Mazingira," which was later re-branded as "Waweza." This album resulted in increased public awareness and accolades, most notably for her songs "Waweza" and "Hossana." “Waweza” was nominated as Worship Song and Wanjiru as New Artist of the Year for the 2012 Groove Awards.

The song "Mazingira" was also selected as the theme song of the Kenyan government's campaign to reclaim Mau Forest in 2010. During the launch of this reforestation project in eastern Mau, the incumbent Prime Minister of Kenya was notably impressed by the song, appointing Wanjiru as the official music ambassador for Mau Forest. Under the auspices of this appointment, Wanjiru began the “Mazingira Bora Afya Bora" campaign for the promotion of good health and a healthy environment.

The title song of her second album "Mungu Mkuu", won the 2015 Groove Awards Album of the Year. The hit song Mungu Mkuu saw Evelyn rise to a higher level of musical stardom, since then she has been consistently releasing songs that are well-received across nations.

From her third album titled "Matendo", the song "Tulia" a collaboration with Vick Kitonga Won 2016 groove awards collaboration of the year, "Nikufahamu" from the same album was nominated for Afrima in the category 'inspiration African female artist of the year 2016' .She won the 2016 Xtreem awards worship song of the year. The Sauti Awards U.S.A  2016 nominated her for East Africa female artist of the year.

In 2017 Evelyn had two groove awards nominations; female artist and "Matendo" as album of the year, she was also nominated for Sauti Awards U.S.A  2017 female artist of the year and Video of the year (Matendo).

In 2021 Evelyn released her fifth album "Mwanga" Mwanga” which is Swahili for Light. The Mwanga Album was produced live with audience present by her own record Label Bwenieve on August 30th 2021 at The C.U.E.A L.R.C Auditorium. It consists of 12 audio - visual songs.  Mwanga Album was released on 24th of November exclusively on Boomplay app.

Evelyn has toured different countries like the United States of America where she has performed in over ten different states, South Africa, Ghana, Zimbabwe, Tanzania, South Sudan, and Uganda. She has shared the same platforms in ministry alongside renowned singers like Tasha Cobbs Leonard, Chandler Moore, Sinach, Mary Mary, and many more. She has done a collaboration titled "Sawa"  with Zimbabwean gospel musician Tembalami the song that is doing very well with a lot of airplay, also she collaborated with Mkhululi Bhebhe on his live DVD recording that was done in Johannesburg South Africa the medley "Hakuna Mungu kama wewe" and in Ghana collaborated with gospel singer Celestine Donkor.

On April 7, 2012, Wanjiru married producer Agundabweni Akweyu at Buruburu Baptist Church Nairobi, where her late father-in-law, Rev. Kenneth Akweyu, who served as a senior pastor. Evelyn and her husband Agundabweni stayed in marriage trying to conceive, on the 10th year they conceived their first son, Mshindi Akweyu Agundabweni, on 6th April 2022. She runs a fashion house named bwenieve clothesline, a mentorship program that has raised more aspiring musicians, together with her husband producer Agundabweni Akweyu they run Bwenieve Production and other businesses.

Discography

Albums 
Complete Albums by Evelyn Wanjiru

Songs:

Waweza Album (2012)

 Waweza
 Unatosha
 Hossana
 Anthem
 Namlauduon
 Mazingira

Mungu Mkuu Album (2015)

 Mungu Mkuu
 Utukufu
 Yaweh
 Tunakuabudu
 Ila damu yake yesu
 Karibu Yesu
 Nimwamini
 Damu
 All Glory
 Neno Moja
 Damu Medley

Matendo Album (2017)'

 Nikufahamu
 Baba Inuka
 Tulia tf Vicky
 Matendo
 Halleluya
 Sema Nami
 Sawa ft Tembalami
 Nilingoze
 Subiri ft Mercy Masika & Emmy Kosgei

Celebrate Album (2019)'

 Celebrate
 Bless the Lord
 Jehovah Elohim
 Holy
 It is Amazing
 Nanyenyekea
 Sitaogopa
 I surrender

Mwanga Album (2021)'

1.   Mwanga Album Intro

2.   You're Worthy

3.   Utukufu ( Live)

4.   Mwanga

5.   Nanyenyekea(Live)

6.   Everlasting(Live)

7.   Naringa na Yesu

8.   Baba Inuka(Live)

9.   Mungu Mkuu (Live)

10. Sifa Zitande

11. Umwema

12. Jehovah Elohim (Live)

13. Wonderful

Singles 

 Jehova Elohim 
 Its Amazing
Celebrate
holy
Everlasting
No One Like You
Sitagopa
Worthy ft Eunice Njeri 
Favour ft Celestine Donkor
Hakuna Mungu kama wewe ft Mkhululi Bhebhe

Awards and nominations

References

Sources
 http://www.evelynwanjiru.com/bio/
 Evelyn Wanjiru's Wedding anniversary
 2016 Groove female artist of the year nominee
 2016 Groove worship song of the year winner
 2016 Groove collabo of the year winner
 Evelyn Wanjiru news-uliza links .Retrieved  27 April 2016
 Wowan to Woman-Daily nation news paper retrieved 24 April
 2015 Groove awards album of the year winner 
 2014 Xtreem awards worship song of the year
 2015 Xtreem awards worship song winner
 2015 Xtreem female artist nominee
 2015 Xtreem collabo of the year winner
 2012 Groove awards new artist nominee
 2015 Groove awards worship song nominee
 2015 Groove awards female artist nominee
 Evelyn Wanjiru Album launch Buzz Daily nation. Retrieved 24 April 2016
 2015 Mwafaka awards female artist nominee
 2015 Mwafaka awards song of the year
 2014 Xtreem Awards central Kenya Artist

External links 
 evelynwanjiru.com
 YouTube channel
 Bwenieve (record label)

Kenyan gospel musicians
Performers of contemporary worship music
1989 births
Musicians from Nairobi
21st-century Kenyan women singers
Living people